The 2001–02 Maltese Premier League (known as the Rothmans Premier League for sponsorship reasons) was the 22nd season of the Maltese Premier League, and the 87th season of top-tier football in Malta. The league started on 18 August 2001 and finished on 5 May 2002. Valletta were the defending champions.

Teams 

The following teams were promoted from the First Division at the start of the season:
 Marsa
 Lija Athletic

From the previous Premier League season, the following teams were relegated to the First Division:
 Rabat Ajax
 Xgħajra Tornadoes

First phase

League table

Results

Second phase

Top Six 

The teams placed in the first six positions in the league table qualified for the Top Six, and the points obtained during the first phase were halved (and rounded up) before the start of second phase. As a result, the teams started with the following points before the second phase: Birkirkara 20 points, Hibernians 20, Sliema Wanderers 19, Valletta 18, Ħamrun Spartans 12 and Floriana 11.

Play-out 

The teams which finished in the last four league positions were placed in the play-out and at the end of the phase the two lowest-placed teams were relegated to the First Division. The points obtained during the first phase were halved (and rounded up) before the start of second phase. As a result, the teams started with the following points before the second phase: Marsa 11 points, Pietà Hotspurs 8, Naxxar Lions 6, Lija Athletic 4.

Season statistics

Top scorers

Hat-tricks

Awards

Monthly awards

References

External links 
 Official website

Maltese Premier League seasons
Malta
1